Wang Ai-fen (born 1912) was a Chinese educator and politician. She was among the first group of women elected to the Legislative Yuan in 1948.

Biography
Originally from Xiaoshan County in Zhejiang Province, Wang studied at the Peking University, graduating from the Department of Foreign Languages and Literature. She then studied for a master's degree at the University of Paris. Returning to China, she worked as a lecturer at Peking University and Fu Jen Catholic University, later becoming a professor at the University of Shanghai. She was appointed chair of the Beiping Women's Anti-Japanese National Salvation League and became involved with the New Life Movement, serving as director general of its women's section in Beiping. After serving on Beiping municipal council, she was one of the first elected members of Beiping City Council.

In the 1948 elections for the Legislative Yuan, she was a Kuomintang candidate in Beiping and was elected to parliament. She relocated to Taiwan during the Chinese Civil War, where she remained a member of the Legislative Yuan and became a professor at National Taiwan Normal University. She also taught at Shih Hsin University and Tamkang University.

Wang was married twice, to Fang Xianxu and later , a diplomat who served as ambassador to several countries.

References

1912 births
Peking University alumni
University of Paris alumni
Academic staff of Peking University
Academic staff of Fu Jen Catholic University
University of Shanghai alumni
20th-century Chinese women politicians
Members of the Kuomintang
Members of the 1st Legislative Yuan
Members of the 1st Legislative Yuan in Taiwan
Academic staff of the National Taiwan Normal University
Academic staff of Shih Hsin University
Academic staff of Tamkang University
Date of death unknown